The 1999 Mountain West Conference football season was the first since eight former members of the Western Athletic Conference banded together to form the MW. Colorado State University, Brigham Young University and the University of Utah tied for the inaugural MW Championship.

Bowl games

Mountain West Individual Awards

All-Conference Teams